Großer Bösenstein (2,448 m) is a mountain of the Lower Tauern in Styria, Austria. It is located near the village of Hohentauern, which is the starting point for most climbs, and is the third highest mountain of the Rottenmann and Wölz Tauern sub-range. It is a hiking peak, and the view from the summit provides an excellent view of the far Eastern Alps, including Grimming and the Totes Gebirge.

References

Mountains of the Alps
Rottenmann and Wölz Tauern
Mountains of Styria